Tiger is a 2015 Indian Telugu-language romantic action film starring Sundeep Kishan, Seerat Kapoor and Rahul Ravindran in the lead roles. The film is directed by Vi Anand and produced by NV Prasad. It was released on 26 June 2015 with positive reviews from critics and audiences.

Plot 
The story begins with Vishnu (Rahul Ravindran) being chased by goons on the banks of Ganga river in Varanasi. While he is trying to escape, his bike gets hit by a car and gets severely hurt in the accident. While he is fighting with death, he narrates the story of his love and friendship.

Vishnu is an orphan and Tiger (Sundeep Kishan) is his best friend in the orphanage. Tiger does anything for his friend Vishnu.  Vishnu falls in love with a girl called Ganga from Banaras Hindu University  who attends the symposium. Misunderstandings occur in between Tiger and Vishnu due to Ganga and Vishnu asks Tiger not to meet him anymore. Eventually Vishnu lands in problems while trying to elope with Ganga. Vishnu is seen and taken to hospital by a person (Saandip) passing by that road in a new car. Before undertaking surgery in the hospital, Vishnu says Tiger's phone number to doctors and they try to reach Tiger. The rest of the story is all about how Tiger saves Vishnu and unites him with Ganga.

Cast 

 Sundeep Kishan as Tiger
 Rahul Ravindran as Vishnu
 Seerat Kapoor as Ganga
 Saandip as person who admits Vishnu in hospital
 Tanikella Bharani as Orphanage Principal
 Y. Kasi Viswanath as Vishnu's foster parent
 Nagendra Babu as College Symposium Chief Guest
 Saptagiri
 Praveen as Tiger's friend
 Venu Tillu as Tiger's friend
 Sudigali Sudheer as Tiger's friend
 Josh Ravi as Tiger's friend
 Satya as Software Engineer
 Snigdha as Ganga's friend
 Fish Venkat as Villain Goon
 Raghu Karumanchi as Villain Goon
 Thagubothu Ramesh as Mortuary Drunkard
 Doraiswamy Iyer as Ganga's grandfather

Soundtrack
The music was composed by S. Thaman and released by Junglee Music.

Reception 
Jeevi of Idlebrain.com wrote that "It’s a tight script with a well written screenplay. Except for a few forced comedy scenes, the entire film runs organically".

References

External links 
 

Films shot in Telangana
Films scored by Thaman S
Indian action drama films
Films about friendship
2010s Telugu-language films
2015 action drama films